Enn Reitel (born 21 June 1950) is a Scottish actor who specialises in voice work in video games, movies and TV shows.

Early life
Reitel's family arrived in Scotland as refugees from Estonia and Germany. He trained as an actor at the Central School of Speech and Drama.

Career

Acting
In 1982 Reitel starred in The Further Adventures of Lucky Jim, a sitcom on BBC Two written by Dick Clement and Ian La Frenais. Reitel played Jim Dixon, based on the character created by Kingsley Amis.

He appeared on stage in Me and My Girl at the Adelphi Theatre in 1986. On television he worked as an impressionist on the satirical puppet show Spitting Image and starred in the ITV sitcom Mog as a burglar who spent his days in a psychiatric hospital, pretending to be insane.

He played the lead role in the UK TV comedy series The Optimist which ran from 1983 for two series. The programme was almost entirely silent. In each episode 'The Optimist' wandered through life doing his best to look on the bright side. He was usually thwarted in his endeavours by the people he encountered. He also appeared in the first series of the UK comedy show Whose Line Is It Anyway?.

Reitel also appeared in a number of BBC radio comedy programmes in the 1980s, including Dial M For Pizza and the radio adaptation of the cartoon strip The Fosdyke Saga.

In 2001 he appeared in a short film called Coconuts with Michael Palin, in which they did a demonstration on how coconuts can be used in place of horses. This film can be seen on the second disk of the collector's edition of Monty Python and the Holy Grail.

He played the lead role in the 2007 film Trust Me, a comedy about a pair of con men.

Reitel was the second choice to play Del Boy Trotter in Only Fools and Horses (behind Jim Broadbent aka Roy Slater in the series), but was busy with other projects (the role ultimately went to David Jason).

He also played two roles in different episodes of long-running sitcom One Foot in the Grave. In the first Christmas special, he played "Mr. Starkey", a down and out who holds Victor Meldrew (Richard Wilson) and his neighbour Pippa's father, Reverend Croker (Geoffrey Chater) at gunpoint to wait for Armageddon on Christmas Day. In the second episode of series 3, "Dreamland", he played a tramp who took a fancy to Victor's shoes, but drew the line at his Noel Edmonds-esque sweater.

Voiceovers
Reitel does voiceovers for The X Factor. He played the Town Crier and The Maggot in Tim Burton's Corpse Bride and played Auric Goldfinger in the 2004 video game GoldenEye: Rogue Agent. It is his voice that provides the vocals on Lemon Jelly's "Nice Weather For Ducks" in 2002. He narrated the in-game promo spot for the Praying Mantis PMC in Metal Gear Solid 4: Guns of the Patriots. He also does Lorenzo Belli's voice from Capcom's survival horror game Haunting Ground. He was also the voice of Billy the ventriloquist dummy in James Wan's movie Dead Silence. He also provided voice performance for the audiobook of the sixth book in Eoin Colfer's Artemis Fowl series, The Time Paradox. Reitel also provided the voice for Delvin Mallory in The Elder Scrolls V: Skyrim and the Wizard Zabodon in The Big Knights. He also provided the voice of Ost Ordura in Kingdoms of Amalur: Reckoning and Alfred Pennyworth in Batman: The Telltale Series. He also played Male Altmer and Dunmer in The Elder Scrolls Online. He also provided voices of The Time Keeper in Skylanders: Swap Force, Laufey in Hulk and the Agents of SMASH, Master Ding in Kung Fu Panda: Legends of Awesomeness, Sebastian Oliver in Adr1ft, Olgan in Baten Kaitos Origins, Bootstrap Bill Turner in Pirates of the Caribbean: Dead Man's Chest, A Male Pedestrian in Infamous, Deraegis in Batman: The Brave and the Bold, Five Leaf Clover Guy, Japanese Deputy, Robertson, Boss Guraji and Fox in TripTank, Edwin Jarvis in Marvel Heroes, An English Spy in American Dad!, Billy in Dead Silence and The Dreamer in The Secret World. In May 2014, Reitel replaced Ade Edmondson as the voice of the Animal in the Peperami adverts.

Filmography

Film
Animal Madness – Various
Bedrooms – Walter
Bob's Weekend – Voice of Man on Television
Carrott U Like – Additional voices
Chicanery – Windsor Silcox
Corpse Bride – Maggot, Town Crier
Dead Silence – Billy
Foodfight! – Kung Tofu, Fracois Fromage
Forgotten Daughters – Liam
Gobble – Voice over artist
Just Another Secret (1989) – Dietrich
Labyrinth – Goblin (uncredited)
Made in Estonia – NATO general
Original Gangster – Cleaner
Postman Pat: The Movie – PC Arthur Selby, Reverend Timms, Pat Wannabe 2, Raed
Quackerz – Emperor Peng Lee
Secret History of Religion: Doomsday - Book of Revelation – Narrator
Secret History of Religion: Knights Templar – Narrator
Splitting Image: Down and Out in the White House – Additional voices
The Adventures of Tintin – Nestor, Mr. Crabtree
The Best Years – Father Jude Best
The Cannibal in the Jungle – Jan Voorhees
The Full Monty – Narrator (uncredited)
The Judge – Mourner
The Lime Grove Story
The Merchant of Venice – Launcelot Gobbo
The Prestige – Workman 1
The Santa Clause 3: The Escape Clause – (uncredited)
The Willows in Winter – Otter
The Wind in the Willows – Otter, Rabbit, Policeman, Gaoler
Throne of Elves – Blacksmith
Tiny Revolutions – Secret policeman
Trust Me – Joe

Shorts
Couples and Robbers – Keith
Day After Yesterday – The Dad
Doppelganger – Dowdsley
Ogri – Sweeney
Splitting Image: The Ronnie and Nancy Show – Additional voices
The Band Parts – Harry

Documentaries
Cosmos: A Spacetime Odyssey – Albert Einstein, hyde Park Gent
Heroes of Comedy
How to Use Your Coconuts – Assistant
Inside the Two Worlds of 'The Corpse Bride''' – Maggot (uncredited)I Love 1980's – HimselfMonkey Business – PG Tips ChimpScience of the Bible – Narrator

TV specialsComic Relief – Himself

TV series2DTV – Prime Minister Tony Blair, Jack Straw, John Prescott, Michael Jackson, Anthony McPartlin, Jeremy Clarkson, Michael Howard, Simon Cowell, Gordon Ramsay, Prince Harry, Tom Cruise, Laurence Llewelyn-Bowen, Pope John Paul II, Johnny Vegas, Will Young, Tim Henman, Justin Hawkins, Jack Osbourne, Phil Spencer, David Dimbleby, Peter Andre, Frank Skinner, Des Lynam, Robbie Williams, Gareth Gates, Uri Geller, David Blunkett, Charles Kennedy, Dick Cheney, Arnold Schwarzenegger, Prince Philip, Prince Edward, Prince William, Osama bin Laden, Wayne Rooney, Various voicesAmerican Dad! – English SpyArcher – Additional voicesArt Ninja – NarratorBarney – NarratorBatman: The Brave and the Bold – DeraegisBoston Legal – Father Kevin MaherBremner, Bird and FortuneComedy Playhouse – NarratorCanned Carrott – NarratorCoronation Street – PhotographerCribb – Mr. StrangeCharlie and Lola – Hedgehogs, Additional Voices (2 episode)Drop the Dead Donkey – Voice-OverFamily Guy - Mickey Rooney, Additional voicesFanboy & Chum Chum – Wizard Tooth Fairy (Episode "Tooth or Scare")General Hospital – PolicemanGrey's Anatomy – Gerhardt StraussHulk and the Agents of S.M.A.S.H. – LaufeyITV Sunday Night Drama – The ReporterKung Fu Panda: Legends of Awesomeness – Master DingMinoriteam – Jewcano, NarratorMisfits – SkinnerMog – MogMonkey Dust – Additional voicesMr. Bean: The Animated Series – Additional voicesOne Foot in the Grave – The Tramp, StarkeyPallas – ActorPercy the Park Keeper – Male animalsPeter Panzerfaust – Older GilbertPhineas and Ferb – Additional voicesRoadies – Edgar Cumberland HughesRory Bremner – VariousRound the Bend – Additional voicesScreen One – Rick
Sheeep – Gogol, Moze, Uncle Elliott, Mrs. Wolfgang, Additional voicesSpitting Image – Geoffrey Howe, Cecil Parkinson, Robert Maxwell, Dustin Hoffman, Denis Thatcher, Norman Fowler, Konstantin Chernenko, Prince Philip, Paddy Ashdown, Chris Patten, Michael Jackson, Denis Healey, Nelson Mandela, Julian Clary, Winston Churchill, Donald Sinden, Lester Piggott, Peter Snow, David Owen, Mark Phillips, Alec Guinness, Ian St John, OJ Simpson, Gary Barlow, Prince William, Paul Condon, Jack Straw, Satan, Paul Keating, Kenneth Baker, Phil Cool, Paul Channon, Pope John Paul II, Donald Coggan, Jesse Jackson, David Attenborough, Mikhail Gorbachev, Nicholas Witchell, David Icke, West Midlands Police Sergeant, Norman Tebbit, Polish advertiser, Neil Kinnock, Kenneth Clarke, George Younger, Elton John, Matt Aitken, Laurence Olivier, Frank Bruno, Prince Harry, Frank Bough, Richard Branson, Robert Maclennan, Mark Knopfler, Caspar Weinberger, Rick Rickerson, Q, Desmond Wilcox, Ray Cooney, Nicholas Fairbairn, David Gergen, Vincent Price, Bobby Robson, Ian MacGregor, Roy Jenkins, Paul McCartney, Kieran Prendiville, Translator, PrinceSquirrel Boy – ManzioThe Adventures of Dodo – Dodo (Voice)The Almost Complete History of the 20th Century – Various CharactersThe Big Knights – Wizard ZabodonThe Bill – Nigel DoughtieThe Gentle Touch – TDC PowerThe Ghosts of Motley Hall – Assistant DirectorThe Imaginatively Titled Punt & Dennis ShowThe Further Adventures of Lucky Jim – Jim DixonThe Optimist – The OptimistThe Staggering Stories of Ferdinand de Bargos – ActorThe Thundermans – Basil Healy HutchinsonThe Wingfeather Saga – Zouzab, Shaggy, Buzzard WillieThe World of Peter Rabbit and Friends – Robin, Mr. Bouncer, Cock Robin, Insects, Grocer, Animals, Kep, Mr. Drake Puddle-Duck, SparrowsTractor Tom – NarratorTripTank – Five Leaf Clover Guy, Japanese Deputy, Boss Guraji, Robertson, FoxUnion Jackass – GeorgeVirtual Murder – Jed Frewin

TV mini-seriesAshenden – Radio Disc JockeyIf You See God, Tell Him – With the voices of

VideosThe Beano Video – Dogs, Narrator #2, Teacher, Headmaster, Ted, Horse, Shark, Scorcher, HareThe Beano Videostars – Rasher, Walter the Softy (Flutterby and Dennis Meets His Match), Alien #1, Birds, Cats, Female Alien, Fatty Fudge, Danny (singing), 'Erbert, Fatty, Spotty, Wilfrid, Janitor, Winston, Elephant, Woodworm, Hairdresser, Mr. Robot, Ted, Snake, Chicken, Chick, Ma’s Porridge Narrator, Monkey, Pedestrian #1, Pedestrian #2, Poolgoer #1, Poolgoer #4, Child, Ivy's Toys

Video games007: Quantum of Solace – Mr. WhiteAdr1ft – Sebastian OliverAvatar: The Game – Additional voicesBaten Kaitos Origins – OlganCold Winter – Amenkoht Ali-SalahDishonored – Nurse Trimble – The Brigmore Witches DLCDriverEpic Mickey – Additional voicesInfamous – Male PedestrianKingdoms of Amalur: Reckoning – Ost Ordura, additional voicesLegendary – LeFeyMeet the RobinsonsOriginal War – Additional voicesPirates of the Caribbean: Dead Man's Chest – Bootstrap Bill TurnerResistance: Fall of Man – Additional voicesSpongeBob Moves In! – Mermaid ManSkylanders: Swap Force – Time KeeperStar Wars: The Old Republic: Galactic Starfighter – Writch HurleyStar Wars: The Old Republic: Rise of the Hutt Cartel – Additional voicesThe Chronicles of Narnia: Prince Caspian – Additional voicesThe Elder Scrolls Online – Male Altmer, Male DunmerThe Getaway: Black Monday – Additional voicesThe Lord of the Rings: Aragorn's Quest – Additional voicesThe Secret World – The Dreamer, additional voicesThe Weakest Link – Contestants (UK version)Warhammer Online: Wrath of Heroes – ArchivistWorld in Conflict – Additional voicesWorld in Conflict: Soviet Assault'' – Additional voices

References

External links

Living people
Alumni of the Royal Central School of Speech and Drama
People from Forfar
Scottish male television actors
Scottish male video game actors
Scottish male voice actors
Scottish people of German descent
Scottish people of Estonian descent
20th-century Scottish male actors
21st-century Scottish male actors
1950 births